The National Women's Soccer League Player of the Week is a weekly soccer award given to individual players in the National Women's Soccer League. The honor is awarded to the player deemed to have put in the best performances over the past week by a panel of journalists who regularly cover the league.

Winners

2013

2014

2015

2016

2017

2018

2019

2021 Challenge Cup

2021

2022 Challenge Cup

2022

Multiple winners

The below table lists those who have won on more than one occasion.

See also 

 List of sports awards honoring women
 NWSL awards
 NWSL Rookie of the Month
 NWSL Player of the Month
 NWSL records and statistics
 Women's soccer in the United States

References 

 2013

 2014

 2015

 2016

 2017

 2018

 2019

 2021

 2022

Player of the Week
Awards established in 2013
Player of the Week
Lists of women's association football players
Association football player non-biographical articles